Grand Prix motor racing, a form of motorsport competition, has its roots in organised automobile racing that began in France as early as 1894. It quickly evolved from simple road races from one town to the next, to endurance tests for car and driver. Innovation and the drive of competition soon saw speeds exceeding , but because early races took place on open roads, accidents occurred frequently, resulting in deaths both of drivers and of spectators. A common abbreviation used for Grand Prix racing is "GP" or "GP racing".

Grand Prix motor racing eventually evolved into formula racing, and one can regard Formula One as its direct descendant. Each event of the Formula One World Championships is still called a Grand Prix; Formula One is also referred to as "Grand Prix racing". Some IndyCar championship races are also called "Grands Prix".

Origins of organized racing 

Motor racing was started in France, as a direct result of the enthusiasm with which the French public embraced the motor car. Manufacturers were enthusiastic due to the possibility of using motor racing as a shop window for their cars. The first motoring contest took place on July 22, 1894, and was organised by a Paris newspaper, . He finished 3 minutes 30 seconds ahead of Albert Lemaître (Peugeot), followed by Auguste Doriot (Peugeot, 16 minutes 30 seconds back), René Panhard (Panhard, 33 minutes 30 seconds back), and Émile Levassor (Panhard, 55 minutes 30 seconds back). The official winners were Peugeot and Panhard as cars were judged on their speed, handling and safety characteristics, and De Dion's steam car needed a stoker which the judges deemed to be outside of their objectives.

In 1900, James Gordon Bennett, Jr., the owner of the New York Herald and the International Herald Tribune, established the Gordon Bennett Cup. He hoped the creation of an international event would drive automobile manufacturers to improve their cars. Each country was allowed to enter up to three cars, which had to be fully built in the country that they represented and entered by that country's automotive governing body. International racing colours were established in this event. The 1903 event occurred in the aftermath of the fatalities at the Paris-Madrid road race, so the race, at Athy in Ireland, though on public roads, was run over a closed circuit: the first ever closed-circuit motor race.

In the United States, William Kissam Vanderbilt II launched the Vanderbilt Cup at Long Island, New York in 1904.

First Grands Prix

This may stem from a mistranslation of the contemporary French sources such as the magazine  of March 1901. The  was the name of the prizes awarded for the lesser classes ('Light cars' and 'Voiturettes'). The  was the name of the prize awarded for the 'Heavy' (fastest) class.

In  Pierre Souvestre described the 1901 event as: "in the Circuit du Sud-Ouest, at the meeting in Pau".

First Grand Prix and the 

The only race at the time to regularly carry the name Grand Prix was organised by the Automobile Club de France (ACF), of which the first took place in 1906. The circuit used, which was based in Le Mans, was roughly triangular in shape, each lap covering . Six laps were to run each day, and each lap took approximately an hour using the relatively primitive cars of the day. The driving force behind the decision to race on a circuit – as opposed to racing on ordinary roads from town to town – was the Paris to Madrid road race of 1903. During this race a number of people, both drivers and pedestrians – including Marcel Renault – were killed and the race was stopped by the French authorities at Bordeaux.  Further road based events were banned.

From the 32 entries representing 12 different automobile manufacturers, at the 1906 event, the Hungarian-born Ferenc Szisz (1873–1944) won the  race in a Renault. This race was regarded as the first , which meant "great trial" and the term was used from then on to denote up to the eight most important events of the year.

Races in this period were heavily nationalistic affairs, with a few countries setting up races of their own, but no formal championship tying them together. The rules varied from country to country and race to race, and typically centred on maximum (not minimum) weights in an effort to limit power by limiting engine size indirectly (10–15 L engines were quite common, usually with no more than four cylinders, and producing less than 50 hp). The cars all had mechanics on board as well as the driver, and no one was allowed to work on the cars during the race except for these two. A key factor to Renault winning this first Grand Prix was held to be the detachable wheel rims (developed by Michelin), which allowed tire changes to occur without having to lever the tire and tube off and back on the rim. Given the state of the roads, such repairs were frequent. Early Grand Prix cars could be technically innovative, with marques such as Peugeot using technology that would later become more widespread.

Political numbering and renaming
A further historic confusion arose in the early 1920s when the Automobile Club de France attempted to pull off a retrospective political trick by numbering and renaming the major races held in France before the 1906 French Grand Prix as being , despite their running pre-dating the formation of the Club. The ACF used this numbering in 1933, although some members of the Club dismissed it, "concerned the name of the Club was lent to the fiction simply out of a childish desire to establish their Grand Prix as the oldest race in the world".

Racecourse development 

For the most part, races were run over a lengthy circuit of closed public roads, not purpose-built private tracks. The exceptions were the steeply banked egg-shaped near oval of Brooklands in England, completed in 1907; the Indianapolis Motor Speedway, first used in 1909 with the first Indianapolis 500-Mile Race in 1911; and the Autodromo Nazionale Monza, in Italy, opened in 1922.

In 1908, the United States of America became the first country outside France to host an automobile race using the name Grand Prix (or Grand Prize), run at Savannah. The first  outside France was the 1921 Italian Grand Prix held at Montichiari. This was quickly followed by Belgium and Spain (in 1924), and later spread to other countries including Britain (1926). Strictly speaking, this still was not a formal championship, but a loose collection of races run to various rules. (A "formula" of rules had appeared just before World War I, finally based on engine size as well as weight, but it was not universally adopted.)

Since the inception of Grand Prix racing, competitions had been run in accordance with a strict formula based on engine size and vehicle weight. These regulations were virtually abandoned in 1928 with an era known as Formula Libre when race organisers decided to run their events with almost no limitations. From 1927 to 1934, the number of races considered to have Grand Prix status exploded, jumping from five events in 1927, to nine events in 1929, to eighteen in 1934 (the peak year before World War II).

During this period a lot of changes of rules occurred. There was a mass start for the first time at the 1922 French Grand Prix in Strasbourg. The 1925 season was the first season during which no riding mechanic was required in a car, as this rule was repealed in Europe after the death of Tom Barrett during the 1924 Grand Prix season. The 1933 Monaco Grand Prix was the first time in the history of the sport that the grid was determined by timed qualifying rather than the luck of a draw.

The Pre-WWII years 

All the competing vehicles were painted in the international auto racing colors:
blue (Bleu de France) for France,
green (British racing green) for Britain,
red (Rosso corsa) for Italy,
white for Germany,
Note: beginning in 1934, the Germans stopped painting their cars, allegedly after the paint had been left off a Mercedes-Benz W25 in an effort to reduce weight. The unpainted metal soon had the German vehicles dubbed by the media as the "Silver Arrows". However, there are conflicting versions of how German Grand Prix cars came to be unpainted. Photos exist of unpainted Mercedes and Auto Union cars as early as 1932.
yellow for Belgium.

French cars continued to dominate (led by Bugatti, but also including Delage and Delahaye) until the late 1920s, when the Italians (Alfa Romeo and Maserati) began to beat the French cars regularly. At the time, the Germans engineered unique race vehicles as seen in the photo here with the Benz aerodynamic "teardrop" body introduced at the 1923 European Grand Prix at Monza by Karl Benz.

In the 1930s, however, nationalism entered a new phase when the Nazis encouraged Mercedes and Auto Union to further the glory of the Reich. (The government did provide some money to the two manufacturers, but the extent of the aid into their hands was exaggerated in the media; government subsidies amounted to perhaps 10% or less of the costs of running the two racing teams.) The two German marques utterly dominated the period from 1935 to 1939, winning all but three of the official Championship Grands Prix races run in those years.

As early as October 1923, the idea of an automobile championship was discussed at the annual autumn conference of the AIACR (Association Internationale des Automobile Clubs Reconnus) in Paris. However, discussion centered on the increased interest in racing by manufacturers and holding the first European Grand Prix at Monza in 1923. The first World Championship took place in 1925, but it was for manufacturers only, consisting of four races of at least  in length. The races that formed the first Constructors' Championship were the Indianapolis 500, the European Grand Prix, and the French and Italian Grands Prix. A European Championship, consisting of the major Grand Prix in a number of countries (named ) was instituted for drivers in 1931, and was competed every year until the outbreak of World War II in 1939 with the exception of 1933 and 1934.

The post-war years and Formula One 

In 1946, following World War II, only four races of Grand Prix calibre were held. It announced the new International Formula, also known as Formula 1 or Formula A, to be effective from 1947. A points system was established and a total of seven races were granted championship status including the Indianapolis 500. The first World Championship race was held on 13 May 1950 at Silverstone in the United Kingdom.

The Italians once again did well in these early World Championship races, both manufacturers and drivers. The first World Champion was Giuseppe Farina, driving an Alfa Romeo.

Grandes Épreuves by season 

Italics denote that the race was also known as the European Grand Prix.

1906–1914

1921–1929

1930–1939

1940–1945 

For wartime events, see Grands Prix during World War II.

1946–1949

Other events 
Argentine Grand Prix
Australian Grand Prix
Bari Grand Prix
Belgian Grand Prix
Belgrade Grand Prix
Buenos Aires Grand Prix
Chilean Grand Prix
Coppa Acerbo
Coppa Ciano
Czechoslovakian Grand Prix
Donington Grand Prix
Dutch Grand Prix
Hungarian Grand Prix
Lwów Grand Prix
Mille Miglia
Moroccan Grand Prix
New Zealand Grand Prix
Penya Rhin Grand Prix
Russian Grand Prix
San Sebastián Grand Prix
Stockholm Grand Prix (Formula Two)
Swedish Summer Grand Prix
Swedish Winter Grand Prix
Targa Florio
Tripoli Grand Prix
Tunis Grand Prix
United States Grand Prix
Vanderbilt Cup

See also:
List of major automobile races in France
List of major automobile races in Germany
List of major automobile races in Italy

Grand Prix drivers 
Notable drivers of the Grand Prix motor racing era included a few women who competed equally with the men:
 Antonio Ascari - Italy
 Robert Benoist - France
 Clemente Biondetti - Italy
 Georges Boillot - France
 Manfred von Brauchitsch - Germany
 Malcolm Campbell - Great Britain
 Rudolf Caracciola - Germany
/ Luigi Chinetti - Italy; United States after the war
 Louis Chiron - Monaco
 Albert Divo - France
 René Dreyfus - France
 Philippe Étancelin - France
 Luigi Fagioli - Italy
 Giuseppe Farina - Italy; he became the first Formula One champion
 Enzo Ferrari - Italy
 Jules Goux - France
 László Hartmann - Hungary
 Elizabeth Junek - Czechoslovakia
 Hermann Lang - Germany
 Christian Lautenschlager - Germany
 Emilio Materassi - Italy
 Ferdinando Minoia - Italy
 Felice Nazzaro - Italy
 Guy Moll - Algeria
 Hellé Nice - France
 Tazio Nuvolari - Italy
 Kay Petre - Great Britain
 Charles Pozzi - France
 Georges Philippe (Baron Philippe de Rothschild) - France
 Bernd Rosemeyer - Germany
 Richard Seaman - Great Britain
 Henry Segrave - Great Britain
 Raymond Sommer - France
 Whitney Willard Straight - Great Britain
 Hans Stuck - Germany
 Ferenc Szisz - Hungary
 Achille Varzi - Italy
 Emilio Villoresi - Italy
 Luigi Villoresi - Italy
 William Grover-Williams - Great Britain
 Jean-Pierre Wimille - France
 Juan Zanelli - Chile

Championships 
From 1925 onwards, the AIACR and later the FIA organised World and European Championships for Grand Prix manufacturers, drivers and constructors:

World Manufacturers' Championship (1925–1927)
European Drivers' Championship (1931–1932, 1935–1939)
World Drivers' Championship (1950–1980)
International Cup for Constructors (1958–1980)
Formula One World Drivers' Championship (1981–present)
Formula One World Constructors' Championship (1981–present)

Notes

 1st Grand Prix de l'Automobile Club de France - 1895 Paris–Bordeaux–Paris;
 2nd Grand Prix de l'Automobile Club de France - 1896 Paris–Marseille–Paris;
 3rd Grand Prix de l'Automobile Club de France - 1898 Paris–Amsterdam–Paris Trail; 
 4th Grand Prix de l'Automobile Club de France - 1899 Tour de France Trail. 16–24 July;
 5th Grand Prix de l'Automobile Club de France - 1900 Paris-Toulouse-Paris Trail;
 6th Grand Prix de l'Automobile Club de France - 1901 Paris-Berlin Trail;
 7th Grand Prix de l'Automobile Club de France - 1902 Paris-Vienna Trail;
 8th Grand Prix de l'Automobile Club de France - 1903 Paris-Madrid Trail;
 9th Grand Prix de l'Automobile Club de France - 1906 1st Grand Prix de l'Automobile Club de France. (Le Mans);
 10th Grand Prix de l'Automobile Club de France - 1907 Grand Prix de l'Automobile Club de France. (Dieppe);
 11th Grand Prix de l'Automobile Club de France - 1908 Grand Prix de l'Automobile Club de France. (Dieppe);

See also
 History of auto racing
 Auto racing
 Formula One
 List of Formula One Grand Prix winners

References

External links 
Grandprix-Live.com - Covers all the major Grand Prix motorsport championships, including Formula One, MotoGP, NASCAR, IRL, WSBK, WRC Rally and many more.
Grand Prix History  - The Story of the Grand Prix

 
Auto racing by type
Formula One